Leyrat is a commune in the Creuse department in the Nouvelle-Aquitaine region in central France.

Geography
The Petite Creuse river flows through the middle of the commune's territory.

Population

Sights
 The church of St. Désiré, dating from the twelfth century.
 The ruins of the chateau of Motte-au-Groing.

See also
Communes of the Creuse department

References

Communes of Creuse